Jochen van der Steijn (born 11 April 1979), better known by his stage name Jochen Miller , is a trance musician and progressive house DJ from Langenboom in the province of North Brabant in southern Netherlands.

Biography
He started his career under the alias "DJ Jochen"; changing to his current name in 2003. He began his career at 16, practicing his mixing skills at a disco owned by his father, where he went on to become a resident DJ. Two years later, at the age of 18, he had a residency at Zino's dance club in Tilburg, NL. In 1999, he won the Dutch Mixing Championships at Dance Valley, where he gained attention for spinning three turntables. In 2001, he became the first resident DJ at The Matrixx club, in Nijmegen, Netherlands. He has since gone on to play at various clubs and events throughout the Netherlands and following burgeoning popularity, globally as well. In 2008, his single "Lost Connection" was featured on Armin van Buuren's popular annual compilation mix album, A State of Trance 2008, thus propelling him to international recognition. In 2010, he signed to David Lewis Productions DJ Agency and in 2011 wrote the song "Rotunda" with Markus Schulz. which was debuted at Armin van Buuren's A State Of Trance 500, which was being held in Buenos Aires at the time.

On 6 February 2012 (on Beatport) he released "Wild and Perfect Day" which was co-produced with Rank 1 and Sarah Bettens.

On 12 September 2016 he released Cephalon on Armada Zouk. 2 days later it was announced via Twitter that he had completed a new song in collaboration with Finnish DJ Tom Fall and American Singer & DJ Tim White. The result of that collaboration was "Sober" which was released on 7 November 2016 on Armada Zouk.

Stay Connected radio 

Jochen Miller also hosts the Radio Show "Stay Connected", in which he plays the latest tracks of the current moment within the scene. The show is only hosted once a month and can be heard as part of Armin van Buuren's "A State of Sundays" Radio Show hosted on Siriux XM's Electric Area. His "Stay Connected" is a duration of 1 hour.

"Stay Connected" can also be found on the Dance Tunes radio website as part of a downloadable Podcast

The tracks that brought Jochen to popularity can also be heard just before the radio show starts as they are highlighted. These are tracks such as "Stay connected", "Face Value", "Brace yourself" and lastly "Lost Connection" as mentioned above.

Discography

Albums 
 2015: Fearless [Armada Music B.V.]

Remixes 
 2015: A Million Pieces (Remixes)
 2015: Fearless (Remixes)
 2016: Disfunktion & Husman feat. Chris Arnott - Everything Is Beautiful (Jochen Miller Remix)
 2016: Cuebrick & Apek feat. Linney - Safe (Jochen Miller Remix)

Releases 
 2009: Jochen Miller - Brace Yourself [High Contrast Recordings]
 2009: Jochen Miller - Red One [High Contrast Recordings]
 2010: Jochen Miller - Humanoid [High Contrast Recording]
 2010: Jochen Miller - 3 Days Later [High Contrast Recordings]
 2014: Jochen Miller - Cubic [Mainstage Music]
 2014: Jochen Miller - Flash [Armada Trice]
 2014: Jochen Miller and Dmitry Ko - We Back [Big & Dirty]
 2014: Jochen Miller featuring Hellen - Let Love Go [Armada Trice]
 2014: Jochen Miller - Bad Rule [Mainstage Music]
 2015: Jochen Miller featuring Hansen Tomas - A Million Pieces [Armada Trice]
 2015: Jochen Miller featuring Chris Hordijk - Fearless [Armada Trice]
 2015: Jochen Miller - Turn It Up [Armada Trice]
 2015: Jochen Miller featuring Simone Nijssen - Slow Down [Armada Trice]
 2015: Jochen Miller and Disfunktion - I Feel [Armada Trice]
 2016: Jochen Miller - Viper [Armada Trice]
 2016: Jochen Miller and Cuebrick - In The Dark [Armada Trice]
 2016: Jochen Miller and Kerano - United [Armada Trice]
 2016 Jochen Miller - Scope [Armada Trice]
 2016: Jochen Miller - Cephalon [Armada Zouk]
 2016: Jochen Miller and Tom Fall feat. Tim White - Sober [Armada Zouk]
 2016: Jochen Miller and Andrew Rayel feat. Hansen Tomas - Take It All [Armind]
 2017: Jochen Miller and Ørjan Nilsen - Renegades [Armind]
 2017: Jochen Miller - Time To Go Back [High Contrast Recordings]
 2017: Jochen Miller - Brace Yourself (Refurbished Mix) [High Contrast Recordings]
 2017: Jochen Miller and JES - Head On [High Contrast Recordings]
 2018: Jochen Miller and Cuebrick - With You [Maxximize Records]

Performances

Jochen Miller performed on 31 October 2015 during PECFEST 2015, an annual techno-cultural festival organized by the students of PEC University of Technology, Chandigarh, India.
He came to Lady Shri Ram College, one of the renowned colleges of Delhi university in its Annual Cultural Fest, Tarang ‘16 from 5 to 7 February, for a visit.

References

External links 
 Official Website

1979 births
Living people
Club DJs
Dutch DJs
Dutch house musicians
Dutch trance musicians
Dutch dance musicians
People from Mill en Sint Hubert
Electronic dance music DJs